Lourens may refer to:

Given name
 Lourens Adriaanse, South African rugby player
 Lourens Erasmus, South African rugby player
 Lourens van der Merwe, South African rugby referee
 Lourens Muller, South African politician and cabinet minister
 Lourens Baas Becking, Dutch botanist and microbiologist
 Lourens Alma Tadema, birth name of Dutch/British painter Lawrence Alma-Tadema

Surname
 Alan Lourens, Australian classical musician, composer, euphonium player and conductor
 Fajah Lourens, Dutch actress, model and disc jockey
 Werner Lourens, South African rugby union player
 Thys Lourens, South African rugby player
 Virginia Lourens, Dutch taekwondo practitioner
 Junita Kloppers-Lourens, South African politician

Others
 Lourens River Protected Natural Environment, a section of protected land along the Lourens River in Cape Town, South Africa

See also
 Laurens (disambiguation)